Shaw is a former town in Mineral County, in the U.S. state of West Virginia.

History
A post office called Shaw was established in 1881, and remained in operation until 1973. The community was named after Major Alexander Shaw, a railroad official. The town site was inundated and destroyed by the creation of Jennings Randolph Lake.

References
https://www.mineralwv.org/history-shaw/

Geography of Mineral County, West Virginia